Electoral districts of Poland (()) are defined by Polish election law. Electoral districts can be divided depending on whether they are individual entities or parts of a larger electoral district with regard to elections to 1) parliament (Sejm) and Senate 2) local offices and 3) European Parliament. Each district has a number of mandates calculated on the basis of its population.

List of Sejm constituencies 

Source:

List of Senate constituencies 

Source:

List of European Parliament constituencies 

Source: 

The numbers of elected MEPs in districts may change every election, because to European Parliament are elected 51 persons (52 after brexit) with the highest score in the country.

See also
 Administrative division of Poland
 Elections in Poland

 
Poland
Poland politics-related lists